Ayalizimakhi (Dargwa: ГӀяялизимахьи) is a rural locality (a selo) in Sergokalinsky District, Republic of Dagestan, Russia. The population was 702 as of 2010. There is 1 street.

Geography 
Ayalizimakhi is located 13 km southwest of Sergokala (the district's administrative centre) by road. Vanashimakhi and Aymaumakhi are the nearest rural localities.

Nationalities 
Dargins live there.

References 

Rural localities in Sergokalinsky District